Paul Powell may refer to:
 Paul Powell (minister) (1933–2016), dean of Baylor University's George W. Truett Theological Seminary
 Paul Powell (director) (1881–1944), American film director
 Paul Powell (politician) (1902–1970), Illinois Secretary of State in the 1960s
 Paul Powell (baseball) (born 1948), American baseball player
 Paul Powell (footballer) (born 1978), English footballer
 Paul Warner Powell (1978–2010), executed American murderer
 Paul Powell (writer), British writer

See also 

 Paul Howell (disambiguation)